Dina (also spelled Dinah, Dena, Deena) is a female given name.

Women
 Dina bint Abdul-Hamid (1929–2019), Queen consort of Jordan, first wife of King Hussein
 Princess Dina Mired of Jordan (born 1965), Princess of Jordan, wife of Prince Mired bin Ra'ad
 Dina Asher-Smith (born 1995), British sprinter and British 100m & 200m record holder
 Dina Averina (born 1998), Russian rhythmic gymnast
 Dina Babbitt (1923–2009), Czechoslovakian-born American painter and Holocaust survivor
 Dina Lowinger (born late 2000s), Famous Australian socialite <dinalowinger.com> 
 Dina Bélanger (1897–1929), Canadian beatified Catholic nun, mystic and musician
 Dina Chandidas, a medieval poet of Bengal
 Chhan Dina (born 1984), Cambodian painter and sculptor
 Dina Bonnevie (born 1961), Filipina actress
 Dina Carroll (born 1968), English singer
 Dina Doron, Israeli actress
 Dina Eastwood (born 1965), American reporter, news anchor and reality TV star, ex-wife of Clint Eastwood
 Dina Edling (1854–1935), Swedish opera singer
 Dina Feitelson (1926–1992), Israeli educator and professor
 Dina Ellermann (born 1980), Estonian dressage rider
 Dina Garipova (born 1991), Russian singer
 Dina Kotchetkova (born 1977), Russian artistic gymnast
 Dina Koston (1929?–2009), American pianist, music educator and composer
 Dina Lévi-Strauss or Dina Dreyfus (1911–1999), French ethnologist, anthropologist, sociologist and philosopher
 Dina Ali Lasloom, a Saudi woman who was deported from the Philippines back to Saudi Arabia
 Dina Litovsky (born 1979), Ukrainian-born photographer
 Dina Lohan (born 1962), mother of Lindsay Lohan
 Dina Manzo, former co-star of The Real Housewives of New Jersey and star of HGTV's Dina's Party
 Dina Merrill, stage name of Nedenia Marjorie Hutton (1923–2017), American actress, socialite and philanthropist
 Dina Meyer (born 1968), American actress
 Dina Miftakhutdynova (born 1973), Ukrainian retired rower
 Faradina Mohd. Nadzir, also known as Dina Nadzir, Malaysian Idol 2004 runner-up
 Dina Porat, Israeli historian
 Dina Powell (born 1973), American business executive and former government officeholder
 Dina Pugliese (born 1974), Canadian TV personality
Dina Stars, Cuban activist and YouTuber.
 Dina Tala'at (born 1964), Egyptian belly dancer
 Dina Titus (born 1950), Nevada politician
 Dina Vinhofvers (1620–1651), Danish silk worker who made (and later retracted) an accusation of an assassination plot against the king
 Dina Wadia (1919–2017), daughter of Mohammad Ali Jinnah, the founder of Pakistan
 Dina Boluarte currently the president of Peru

Men
 Raja Dina Nath (1795–1857), Privy Seal and finance minister (Diwan) in the Punjab empire of Maharaja Ranjit Singh

See also 
 Dirección de Inteligencia Nacional or DINA, the Chilean secret police under Augusto Pinochet
 Dinah (disambiguation) 
 Dena (given name)
 Deena, a list of people with the given name

Feminine given names
Greek feminine given names
Italian feminine given names
Hebrew feminine given names
Arabic feminine given names